Empresas Polar is a Venezuelan corporation that started as a brewery, founded in 1941 by Lorenzo Alejandro Mendoza Fleury, Juan Simon Mendoza, Rafael Lujan and Karl Eggers in Antímano "La Planta de Antimano", Caracas. It is the largest and best known brewery in Venezuela, but has since long diversified to an array of industries, mostly related to food processing and packaging, also covering markets abroad.

Products

Original line
Production of Cerveza Polar, a 5% abv lager began during the 1940s, and eventually, the company grew into the largest beer producing company in Venezuela, producing also Solera, Solera Light, Polar Light, Polar Ice, Polar Zero and Polar Zilch. The name comes from the polar bear, whose image is imprinted on the beer bottles. Maltin Polar “energia natural y full sabor”, is another of their most famous products, a Malta, similar to a nonalcoholic ale style beer, suited for all ages.

Beers
The company produces five different brands of lager with slight variations in abv strength and taste, such as "Solera" at 6% abv, called Verde (green) because of its bottle color, "Polar Pilsen" at 5% abv, called Negra (black) or Negrita (Blackie), "Solera Light" at 4.3% abv, called Azul (Azulita), "Polar Ice" at 4.5% abv, "Polar Light" at 4% abv. There is also a nonalcoholic beer called "Polar Zilch".

Polar's signature Pilsen product started distribution in the United States in 1985 under the leadership of Carlos Eduardo Stolk, President and Chairman of the Board of Empresas Polar for over 30 years.

Their non-alcoholic product aimed at the youth market, Maltin Polar, is basically a type of soft drink called Malta which is similar to ale beers with hops but with some caramel flavouring. Its taste is comparable to that of a dark, very sweet beer.

Other products
The company has diversified its range of products, mainly by acquiring other companies and now also produces snacks, maize flour (which is the base for the main Venezuelan meals), ice-creams (Helados Efe), soft drinks and malt beverages (Cervecería Polar, Refrescos Golden and bottles Pepsi-Cola and Diet Pepsi for the Venezuelan and North Andean market). Polar also bought the food manufacturer Mavesa, which produces mayonnaise, ketchup, margarine and a blue biodegradable soap (Las Llaves). The company also set a joint venture with the French cognac manufacturer Martell in the state of Lara to produce wines locally. The company's name is Bodegas Pomar.

Polar is currently trying to expand their frontiers, by exporting some of their products to other countries, currently some Polar products can be purchased in the United States of America. Maltin Polar, Polar Beer and Harina PAN. Recently the "Maltin Polar" and "Polar ICE" have been introduced into the Puerto Rican market.

Enterprises 
Cervecería Polar, C.A.
Alimentos Polar, C.A.
Pepsi Cola Venezuela, C.A.

Economic crisis
During the economic crisis in Venezuela in 2016 production of beer was suspended due to the firm's inability to access a supply of barley.

References

External links
RateBeer
Empresas Polar

 
Beer in Venezuela
Food and drink companies established in 1941
Food and drink companies of Venezuela
Conglomerate companies of Venezuela
Venezuelan brands
1941 establishments in Venezuela
PepsiCo bottlers
Multinational companies headquartered in Venezuela